Nikita Ducarroz (born 12 August 1996 in Nice, France) is a Swiss Freestyle BMX Olympic bronze medalist.

In 2019 she also finished fifth at the UCI Urban Cycling World Championships, fourth at the UCI Freestyle BMX World Cup and then won the 2020 BMX Simple Session in Tallinn, Estonia. During the Covid-19 pandemic, Ducarroz was in lockdown at the Daniel Dhers Action Sports Complex training facility in Holly Springs, North Carolina. She won the silver medal at the 2021 UCI Urban Cycling World Championships in the Freestyle BMX, and again in 2022.

Early life 
Born in Nice, France to a Swiss French father and an American mother of Chaldean and Sicilian descent, she grew up in Glen Ellen, California. At the age of 11, she began suffering from crippling anxiety which forced her to quit playing association football and attend online school. Her mother wanted her to pursue another sport. Through YouTube, Ducarroz found BMX.

References

External links 
 
 

1996 births
Living people
BMX riders
Swiss female cyclists
Sportspeople from Nice
Swiss people of American descent
Swiss people of Italian descent
Swiss people of Iraqi descent
Olympic cyclists of Switzerland
Cyclists at the 2020 Summer Olympics
Medalists at the 2020 Summer Olympics
Olympic bronze medalists for Switzerland
Olympic medalists in cycling
21st-century Swiss women